The Shipwrights Arms is a Grade II listed public house at 88 Tooley Street, London Bridge, London.

It was built in the mid-late 19th century.

See also

Customer Service
Customer Experience
Trading Standards

References

Grade II listed buildings in the London Borough of Southwark
Grade II listed pubs in London
Pubs in the London Borough of Southwark